Filip Erceg (born 1979) is a Croatian writer, journalist and political scientist.

Erceg was born in Slavonski Brod, but lived his childhood in Bjelovar. He graduated in politology at the Faculty of Political Sciences, University of Zagreb. As a student, he co-edited Hrvatska ljevica and was a member of the Central Committee of the Socialist Labour Party (and later also the Vice-President of the party). He was a member of the editorial board of the philosophical journal 11. teza ("Thesis Eleven") and is on the executive committee of August Cesarec Foundation. Filip Erceg is also a member of the editorial board of a left-wing magazine Novi Plamen. Erceg is credited with inventing the term "altermodernism" as a contemporary reinvention or recalibration of modernism. He has also been publicly outspoken on what he perceives as the retrograde historical phenomena associated with far Right clericalism.

Works
His first book is Krvav povoj rane (2006) . He has also written a book of political essays Od socijalizma do pesimizma, published in 2008 by the Demokratska misao publishing house. Erceg contributed articles for Hrvatska književna enciklopedija (The Croatian Literary Encyclopaedia).

He also published poetry, essays and short stories in several magazines including the leading Croatian literary journal Književna republika, Balkan Literary Herald Balkanski književni glasnik etc., and articles in  Večernji list, Vjesnik, Novosti, Objektiv, Hrvatska ljevica, Novi Plamen etc.

See also
 Novi Plamen
 11.teza
 Alter-Modernism
 August Cesarec Foundation
 Hrvatska ljevica

References 

1979 births
People from Slavonski Brod
Faculty of Political Sciences, University of Zagreb alumni
Croatian writers
Croatian journalists
Croatian essayists
Croatian male writers
Male essayists
Living people